The British Quidditch Cup is a quidditch tournament held in the United Kingdom that follows the rules laid out by the International Quidditch Association. It is organised by QuidditchUK, currently led by President Matt Bateman. It is the largest UK tournament of the year.
  
Qualification for the tournament is based on the two regional tournaments Northern and Southern Cup (for university teams) and the Community League (for community teams). Teams who do not qualify for the British Quidditch Cup may instead participate in Development Cup.

Other regular tournaments not organised by QuidditchUK also take place in the UK including the Highlander Cup held in Edinburgh, Cottonopolis held in Manchester and Scottish Cup held in St Andrews. There was also a tournament that ran for 6 years called Whiteknights held in Reading.

Results
The following table shows a list of all British Quidditch Cups to date. The team that caught the snitch is denoted with an asterisk. Up until 2019 both university and community quidditch teams played in the same tournament together. From 2022 and onwards they now compete separately.

All Time

First tournament, November 2013
The first British Quidditch Cup took place in Oxford, England on 9 and 10 November 2013.  Sixteen teams from England, Scotland, Wales and Ireland competed over two days for the inaugural cup, playing in four groups of four with the highest placed eight going on to take part in the knock out format quarter finals, semi finals and the final.

Group stages

DNQ= Did Not Qualify

Knockout stage scores

(*) indicates a snitch catch. Source

(^) indicates a snitch catch in overtime

Final Positions

Overall, the winners were the Radcliffe Chimeras from Oxford University led by captain Ashley Cooper, with Keele Squirrels of Keele University taking the silver medals and the Bangor Broken Broomsticks from Bangor University taking the bronze medals.

Second tournament, March 2015
The second British Quidditch Cup took place on 7–8 March 2015. After five location bids were submitted in May–June 2014, the location for the tournament was narrowed down to the venues proposed by the Loughborough Longshots, Nottingham Nightmares and Norwich Nifflers. After much deliberation, site visits and further communication, the organising committee accepted the bid put forward by the Nightmares, resulting in the 23 teams competing at Wollaton Hall and Deer Park, Nottingham.

Group stage results

DNQ= Did Not Qualify

Knockout stage results

Final standings 
At the second British Quidditch cup Southampton Quidditch Club's first team claiming gold, Oxford Radcliffe Chimeras silver and the Keele Squirrels bronze.

Third Tournament, March 2016
The third British Quidditch Cup took place at Rugeley Leisure Centre on the 19 and 20 March 2016. 32 teams competed, with the first day involving 8 groups of 4 teams where the first two teams entered the upper bracket and the rest entered a lower bracket. These two brackets were then played as knock-out stages on day two.

Group stage results

Knockout stage results

Upper bracket 
The third place match went to overtime without a snitch catch.

Consolation bracket 
The third place match went to overtime without a snitch catch.

Final standings 
This tournament saw Oxford reclaiming gold, Warwick QC claiming silver, and the Durham's durhamstrang claiming bronze. The LB bracket was won by York university's HogYork Horntails with Taxes QC coming runners up.

Fourth Tournament, March 2017 
The fourth British Quidditch Cup took place at Rugeley Leisure Centre on 11–12 March 2017. the top 16 teams from the Northern and Southern regional tournaments competed, with the first day involving 8 groups of 4 teams where the top two teams entered the champions bracket and the others entered the consolation bracket. These two brackets were then played as knock-out stages on day two.

Group stage results

Knockout stage results

Champions bracket

(*) indicates snitch catch

Brizzlebears vs Durhamstrang went to double overtime with no snitch catch

Consolation bracket

Final standings 
This tournament saw Velociraptors QC claiming gold, Bristol's Brizzlebears claiming silver, and the Werewolves of London claiming bronze. The consolation bracket was won by Falmouth Falcons with York university's HogYork Horntails coming runners up.

Fifth Tournament, March 2018 
The fifth British Quidditch Cup took place on 24–25 March 2018 at Brookes Sport Park at Oxford Brooks University. 32 teams competed, with the first day involving 8 groups of 4 teams each competing in a round-robin. The second day consisted of a knockout tournament in both an upper and lower bracket of 16 teams each. Velociraptors QC won the tournament, defeating Warwick Quidditch Club in the final with a catch to take the game into overtime followed by a second winning snitch catch. Werewolves of London won against Southampton Quidditch Club in the 3rd place play-off and Chester Centurions defeated Manchester Quidditch Club to win the consolation bracket final.

Final standings

Sixth Tournament, April 2019 
The sixth British Quidditch Cup took place on 6–7 April 2019 at Northumbria Sport in Newcastle. 32 teams competed, with the first day involving 8 groups of 4 teams each competing in a round-robin. The second day consisted of a knockout tournament in both an upper and lower bracket with 16 teams in each. London Quidditch Club won the tournament.

Knockout stage results

Upper Bracket

Lower Bracket

Final standings

Seventh Tournament, April 2022 
Due to COVID-19, the planned British Quidditch Cup for 2020 was cancelled. In addition plans to host an equivalent event to BQC in April 2021 were shelved due to it being deemed unsafe and impractical. The seventh tournament took place on 9–10 April 2022 at the Sheffield Hallam Sports Centre in Sheffield. This tournament was the first to use a new format and reduced total number of teams of 24 (down from 32). The new format saw university and community teams competing separately, as such 12 of the slots for the tournament were available for community teams and the other 12 slots were available for university teams. 8 of the university slots were available to teams in the Northern region, with the other 4 for teams in the Southern region. The tournament was an opt-in tournament for community teams, whereas for university teams qualification was determined via the final rankings in each region after all Northern and Southern fixtures.

During the actual tournament, 22 teams competed (11 university teams and 11 community teams). In each competition the teams were competed within 3 groups, two of four teams each and one of three teams, before proceeding to a knockout tournament. The structure was set-up such that each team was guaranteed at least two games each day and at least five across the whole tournament. This was done by having a three-team round robin for losing teams from the round of 16 knockout stage and a consolation bracket for losing teams from the quarter final stage on top of a 3rd place play-off.

The winner of the university tournament was Southampton QC and the winner of the community tournament was Werewolves of London Firsts, with the results of the tournament as follows.

University tournament 
11 university teams competed across 3 groups before going into a knockout tournament. The university final was won by Southamptom QC against Exeter Eagles, coming down to both teams being one goal away from the set score of 130 before Southampton scored.

Group stage results

Group 1

Group 2

Group 3

Knockout stage results

Final standings

Community tournament 
Werewolves of London Firsts won the community tournament, defeating London Quidditch Club in the final. After the full 45 minutes of game time in the final the teams were tied with 160 points each, both a single goal away from the winning overtime set score of 170 (Werewolves had caught the snitch earlier in the match). Under concern that the venue was already starting to kick the tournament out with the university final still yet to be played (and in an attempt to avoid going to tiebreakers for a final), it was decided to play two more minutes of golden goal during which Werewolves scored and won the tournament.

Group stage results

Group 1

Group 2

Group 3

Knockout stage results

Final standings

Eighth Tournament, April 2023 
The eighth tournament is currently scheduled to take place on 1–2 April 2023, like the 2022 tournament it will be held in Sheffield and 24 teams will compete.

References 

Quidditch competitions
Recurring sporting events established in 2013
2013 establishments in the United Kingdom
Sports competitions in the United Kingdom